Norpatchoulenol is a tricyclic terpenoid found in commercial patchouli extract in small quantities, and thought to contribute significantly to the aroma of patchouli oil.

See also
Patchoulol

References

Sesquiterpenes
Tertiary alcohols
Tricyclic compounds